Rosemary Clooney Sings the Music of Irving Berlin is a 1984 album by Rosemary Clooney, of songs composed by Irving Berlin and released on Concord Jazz label. Most of the album features Clooney singing with a small swing group directed by pianist John Oddo, though Clooney performs two of the selections ("Be Careful, It's My Heart" and "What'll I Do") as duets with guitarist Ed Bickert.

The album is notable for the presence of Kansas City jazz drummer Gus Johnson in the rhythm section. Johnson played with the Count Basie Orchestra and the Jay McShann Orchestra, and replaced Clooney's regular drummer Jake Hanna. Johnson is teamed with bassist Phil Flanigan, who was at the time a regular member of Scott Hamilton's band (which specialized in pre-World War II swing styles). Chris Flory, also a member of the Hamilton band at the time of the session, appears on acoustic rhythm guitar for two of the selections.

Track listing
 "It's a Lovely Day Today" – 3:16
 "Be Careful, It's My Heart" – 3:20
 "Cheek to Cheek" – 5:18
 "How About Me?" – 4:51
 "The Best Thing for You" – 4:25
 "I Got Lost in His Arms" – 3:04
 "There's No Business Like Show Business" – 4:34
 "Better Luck Next Time" – 4:30
 "What'll I Do" – 3:02 
 "Let's Face the Music and Dance" – 4:12

All music and lyrics by Irving Berlin.

Personnel
 Rosemary Clooney – vocals
 Warren Vaché Jr. – cornet, flugelhorn
 Scott Hamilton – tenor saxophone
 John Oddo – piano
 Ed Bickert – guitar (tracks 1,2,5-10)
 Chris Flory – rhythm guitar (tracks 3,7)
 Phil Flanigan – bass
 Gus Johnson – drums

References

1984 albums
Irving Berlin tribute albums
Rosemary Clooney albums
Concord Records albums